During the period of the Company rule in India and the British Raj, the Commander-in-Chief, India (often "Commander-in-Chief in or of India") was the supreme commander of the British Indian Army. The Commander-in-Chief and most of his staff were based at GHQ India, and liaised with the civilian Governor-General of India. Following the Partition of India in 1947 and the creation of the independent dominions of India and Pakistan, the post was abolished. It was briefly replaced by the position of Supreme Commander of India and Pakistan before the role was abolished in November 1948. Subsequently, the role of Commander-in-Chief was merged into the offices of the Commanders-in-Chief of the independent Indian Army and Pakistan Army, respectively, before becoming part of the office of the President of India from 1950 and of the Commander-in-Chief of the Pakistan Army from 1947.

Prior to independence, the official residence was the Flagstaff House, which later became the residence of the first Prime Minister of India; as Teen Murti Bhavan (Teen Murti House), it is now a museum.

This is a list of people who were the military Commander-in-Chief, India until 1947. The rank and title are the final ones for the officer's career and not necessarily applicable to his tenure as Commander-in-Chief, India.

List of Commanders-in-Chief
Commanders-in-Chief have been:

† denotes people who died in office.

Commanders-in-Chief of India, 1752–1801

Commanders-in-Chief of India, 1801–1857

Commanders-in-Chief of India, 1861–1947

See also
Secretary of State for India
Governor-General of India
Chief of the General Staff
Chief of the Army Staff
Commander-in-Chief of the Pakistan Army

References

External links
 Chronological List of Commanders-in-Chief, India to 1947

British military commanders in chief
Government of British India
Military history of British India
1748 establishments in the British Empire
1947 disestablishments in the British Empire